The Bluff Dale Bridge is a historic cable-stayed bridge (not a suspension bridge) located near Bluff Dale, Texas, United States.

History
The bridge was originally constructed across the river on a dirt road that became Texas State Highway 10, which is now U.S. Route 377. In 1933, a new bridge was built to handle the increasing traffic on U.S. 377.

The bridge was added to the National Register of Historic Places on December 20, 1977. The bridge is on Preservation Texas' 2009 list of most endangered places due to its poor condition and lack of funds for restoration. It was closed to vehicular traffic in 1989 because of its advanced state of deterioration.

Structure type
Despite the name given in Historic American Engineering Record documentation, the Bluff Dale Suspension Bridge is actually a cable-stayed structure. Its deck is suspended from multiple layers of stay cables radiating from the towers, some terminating at the deck and others running continuously from one tower to the other. This pattern of cables was established in designer Edwin Elijah Runyon's first U.S. patent, . It is known as one of only two examples of Runyon's patents, along with the Barton Creek Bridge in Huckabay, Texas. Its hand-twisted wire cable and non-traditional use of wrought-iron pipe components make it a notable example of vernacular American bridge construction.

See also

List of bridges documented by the Historic American Engineering Record in Texas
List of bridges on the National Register of Historic Places in Texas
National Register of Historic Places listings in Erath County, Texas

Notes

References

External links

Bridges completed in 1890
Road bridges on the National Register of Historic Places in Texas
Cable-stayed bridges in the United States
Buildings and structures in Erath County, Texas
Pedestrian bridges in Texas
Former road bridges in the United States
Historic American Engineering Record in Texas
Relocated buildings and structures in Texas
National Register of Historic Places in Erath County, Texas
Wrought iron bridges in the United States
1890 establishments in Texas